Dr. Obote College Boroboro (DOCB) is a government-aided, mixed (co-educational), boarding, secondary school in Uganda. It caters to school grades 8–13 (S1–S6).

Location 
The school campus is located in Boroboro East Parish, Adekokwok Subcounty, in Lira District, in the Northern Region of Uganda. The geographical coordinates of the school campus are 02°11'23.0"N, 32°55'48.0"E (Latitude:2.189722; Longitude:32.930000).

Overview
As of 2000, the school had 1,257 enrolled students, of whom 1,155 (91.9 percent) were males and 102 (8.1 percent) were female. The O-Level section (S1 to S4) were all males, with the girls admitted to S5 and S6 only. All students were residential, without any day-students in the school.

DOCB is strong in science subjects. In 2013 the school won first prize in the high school robotics competition organized by the College of Engineering, Design, Art and Technology of Makerere University, Uganda's oldest and largest public university.

History
According to the school webpage, DOCB was established in 1962 as Lira Junior Secondary School. That same year, it was combined with St Catherine Girls' School. The first head teacher was Mrs. E.A. Angulo. Boroboro Senior Secondary School was established in 1964 and replaced Lira Junior Secondary School. Later in 1964, Boroboro Senior Secondary School was re-named Dr. Obote College Boroboro. The head teacher at that time was Edward Ejura.

Alumni
Prominent alumni of the school include:

 Jacob L'Okori Oulanyah: agricultural economist and lawyer, who serves as the Speaker of the 11th Parliament of Uganda (2021–)

See also
 Education in Uganda

References

External links
Official website

Boarding schools in Uganda
Educational institutions established in 1962
Mixed schools in Uganda
Lira District
Church of Uganda
1962 establishments in Uganda
Schools in Uganda